Sir Paul Whichcote, 2nd Baronet (1643–1721), was a fellow of the Royal Society and the owner of the Manor of Totteridge in Hertfordshire.

Early life and education
Paul Whichcote was born in 1643, the eldest son of Sir Jeremy Whichcote, 1st Baronet (c. 1614–1677), barrister-at-law and Solicitor-General to the Frederick V of the Palatinate, and Anne (died August 1714), eldest daughter and heir of Joseph Grave. His early life was at Quy Hall, Cambridgeshire. He was educated at King's College, University of Cambridge, where he was admitted as a Fellow Commoner in 1662. Whichcote was made a fellow of The Royal Society in 1674 and received his Master of Arts degree from Cambridge University in 1701.

Marriage
Whichcote married Jane, daughter and heir of Sir Nicholas Gould, 1st Baronet, on 14 June 1677, and had several children. His heir was Sir Francis Whichcote, 3rd Baronet (c. 1692–1775).

Hendon and Totteridge
Whichcote was resident at Hendon House, in the grounds of which Hendon School now stands. He inherited the house after the death of his father in 1677 and lived there until 1691.

By 1700, Whichcote was lord of the manor of Totteridge which he acquired from Sir Francis Pemberton and Isaac Foxcroft. He sold it to James Brydges, 1st Duke of Chandos, in 1720 or 1721.

Death
Whichcote died in 1721 and is buried at St Mary's Church, Hendon.

References 

1643 births
1721 deaths
Baronets in the Baronetage of England
Alumni of King's College, Cambridge
Fellows of the Royal Society
Lords of the Manor of Totteridge
People from South Cambridgeshire District